Frederick Lester Quorn Handley (born 11 August 1949) is a former English cricketer. Handley was a left-handed batsman. He was born in Kampala, Uganda.

Handley made his debut for Norfolk in the 1969 Minor Counties Championship against Staffordshire. Handley played Minor counties cricket for Norfolk from 1969 to 1990, which included 161 Minor Counties Championship matches and 18 MCCA Knockout Trophy matches. He made his List A debut for Norfolk against Middlesex in the 1970 Gillette Cup. He made 5 further List A matches for Norfolk, the last coming against Yorkshire in the 1990 NatWest Trophy. In his 6 limited-overs appearances for Norfolk, he scored 72 runs at an average of 12.66, with a high score of 40. He also captained Norfolk.

Playing for Norfolk allowed Handley to represent Minor Counties North in 2 matches in the 1979 Benson & Hedges Cup and the Minor Counties cricket team in 2 matches in the 1985 Benson & Hedges Cup.

Handley's father-in-law Bill Thomas also played for Norfolk and played first-class cricket for Cambridge University.

References

External links
Quorn Handley at ESPNcricinfo
Quorn Handley at CricketArchive

1949 births
Living people
Cricketers from Kampala
English cricketers
Norfolk cricketers
Norfolk cricket captains
Minor Counties cricketers